Khao Ok Thalu or Phukhao Ok Thalu, is a mountain in Phatthalung Province, Thailand. It is a karstic formation.

Tourism
This mountain is east of the Phatthalung railway station. It can be accessed from Wat Khuha Sawan via Highway 4047. There is a flight of stairs leading to the mountaintop where there is a Buddhist shrine overlooking the city of Phatthalung. The mountain is named after a hole near the top. 

Khao Ok Thalu is an unusually-shaped mountain, clearly visible from afar. It has symbolic significance in Phatthalung and appears in somewhat stylized form on the provincial seal of PhatThalung.

See also
List of mountains in Thailand
Phatthalung Province
Seals of the provinces of Thailand

References

External links
Tourism Authority of Thailand (TAT): Phatthalung
Phatthalung Official Website  

Geography of Phatthalung province
Inselbergs of Asia
Hills of Thailand